Robert Ornduff (1932–2000) was an American botanist. He was Director of the University and Jepson Herbaria, Director of the University of California Botanical Garden, Executive Director of the Miller Institute for Basic Research in Science, and Chair of the (former) Department of Botany and Professor of Integrative Biology at the University of California at Berkeley. Botanist Phyllis M. Faber said of him following his death, "his extensive knowledge and love of the California flora remains unmatched."

He was a specialist in the systematics of various plant groups in California, particularly the Asteraceae, Menyanthaceae, and Limnanthaceae. He contributed to the treatments of four families in the 1993 Jepson Manual. He also worked on the population biology of cycads, biogeography, and in biographical research on Charles Darwin historic figures in botanical exploration.

References

American botanical writers
American taxonomists
Biogeographers
1932 births
2000 deaths
Botanists active in California
University of California, Berkeley administrators
Writers from California
Scientists from California
20th-century American male writers
20th-century American non-fiction writers
20th-century American botanists
American male non-fiction writers
20th-century American academics